Gompholobium aspalathoides is a species of flowering plant in the family Fabaceae and is endemic to eastern Australia. It is an erect, more or less glabrous shrub with trifoliate leaves with linear to narrow elliptic leaflets, and yellow pea-like flowers.

Description

Taxonomy
Gompholobium aspalathoides was first formally described in 1837 by George Bentham from an unpublished description by Allan Cunningham. Bentham's description was published in Commentationes de Leguminosarum Generibus. The specific epithet (aspalathoides) means "Aspalathus-like".

Distribution and habitat
This species of pea grows in heath, woodland and forest and is widespread in inland areas from near Bundaberg in Queensland to near Moruya in New South Wales.

References

aspalathoides
Flora of New South Wales
Flora of Queensland
Plants described in 1837
Taxa named by George Bentham